Freedom Sound may refer to:

 Freedom Sound (Poncho Sanchez album), 1997
 Freedom Sound (The Jazz Crusaders album), 1961

See also
 Freedom of Sound, 2005 album by Bret Michaels